This is the page for the British surgeon. For the American founding father, see Benjamin Franklin.

Surgeon-General Sir Benjamin Franklin  (1844 – 17 February 1917) was a British army surgeon.

After being educated at University College, London and in Paris, he entered the Indian Medical Service in April 1869, and worked at Lucknow and Simla. In 1894 he was appointed personal physician to Lord Elgin, the Viceroy, and held this position until 1899.

He was appointed Director General of the Indian Medical Service on 2 December 1901, and was thus the highest ranked officer in the military medical service in British India. The position was combined with that of Sanitary Commissioner with the Government of India, and ranked as a major general, though he also received the personal promotion to the rank of surgeon-general on the day of appointment.

He was honorary physician to Queen Victoria, King Edward VII and King George V, and served as the British delegate to the International Sanitary Conferences at Rome in 1907 and Paris in 1911–12. He was appointed a Companion of the Order of the Indian Empire (CIE), then promoted to a Knight Commander of the order (KCIE) in the 1903 Durbar Honours.

References

Obituary: p. 161, The Annual Register: a review of public events at home and abroad, for the year 1917. London: Longmans, Green and Co. 1918.

1844 births
1917 deaths
British surgeons
Indian Medical Service officers
Knights Commander of the Order of the Indian Empire
Sanitary commissioners